Aspach is a municipality in the district Braunau am Inn in the Austrian state of Upper Austria.

Villages
(Inhabitants as 1 January 2020)

 Aichet (15)
 Aspach  (871)
 Au  (90)
 Baumgarten  (32)
 Buchleiting  (19)
 Döging  (18)
 Dötting  (19)
 Ecking  (8)
 Eigelsberg  (34)
 Eisecking  (16)
 Englham  (25)
 Hinterholz  (128)
 Hobling  (18)
 Kappeln  (32)
 Kasing  (40)
 Kasting  (42)
 Katzlberg  (8)
 Kleinschneidt  (53)
 Leithen  (29)
 Leithen am Walde  (30)
 Maierhof  (24)
 Migelsbach  (74)
 Mitterberg  (11)
 Naderling  (9)
 Niederham  (6)
 Offenschwandt  (23)
 Parz  (1)
 Pimberg  (34)
 Ried  (19)
 Roith  (36)
 Rottersham  (14)
 Steinberg  (42)
 Teinsberg  (11)
 Thal (14)
 Wasserdobl  (38)
 Weißau  (11)
 Wieselberg  (26)
 Wildenau (693)

See also
 Linz
 Upper Austria

References

Cities and towns in Braunau am Inn District